Magnapinna talismani is a species of bigfin squid known only from a single damaged specimen. It is characterised by small white nodules present on the ventral surface of its fins.

Description
The capture location of this specimen is very near to that of the as-yet undescribed Magnapinna sp. B.

Taxonomy
M. talismani was originally placed in the genus Chiroteuthopsis, which is now considered a junior synonym of Mastigoteuthis. Mastigoteuthis talismani was subsequently placed in the genus Magnapinna by Michael Vecchione and Richard E. Young in 2006.

Gallery

References

Bibliography
Fischer, H. & Joubin, L. (1906). "Note sur les Céphalopodes capturés au cours des expéditions du Travailleur et du Talisman". Bulletin du Muséum National d'Histoire Naturelle. 12: 202-205, available online at http://biodiversitylibrary.org/page/5021383.
Fischer, H. & Joubin, L. (1907). "Expéditions scientifiques du Travailleur et du Talisman". Céphalopodes 8: 313-353.
Vecchione, M. & Young, R. E. (2006). "The squid family Magnapinnidae (Mollusca: Cephalopoda) in the AtlanticOcean, with a description of a new species", n. sp.. Proc. Biol. Soc. Wash. 119(3): 365-372.

External links

Tree of Life web project: Magnapinna talismani
Magnapinna talismani: Original description

Squid
Molluscs described in 1907
Species known from a single specimen